Cahuilla, pronounced  , (formerly, Kawia, Coahuilla, Cohuilla, and Coahuila) is an unincorporated community in Riverside County, California. It is part of the Cahuilla Reservation and lies in a high desert valley at an elevation of 3642 feet (1110 m).

The Cahuilla Post Office first opened in 1888, moved in 1889 and 1895, closed in 1903, reopened in 1909, closed for a time in 1919, closed again in 1921, reopened in 1924 before closing for good in 1926. In 1926, the Anza Post Office was officially established.

Facilities in Cahuilla have addresses on Highway 371 and use Anza, CA as their postal code. The Cahuilla Casino, first opened in 1996, and Mountain Sky Travel Center, a convenience store and gas station first opened in 2015, are both owned by the Cahuilla Band of Mission Indians of the Cahuilla Reservation and both located in Cahuilla with addresses in nearby Anza. A new casino and hotel, after some delay from the coronavirus, replaced the old casino and was opened May 2020.

2016-2019 Cahuilla Seismic Swarm 

More than 22,000 individual seismic events were recorded, ranging in magnitude from 0.7 to 4.4. The strongest one occurred in August 2018, south of Lake Riverside, just off Cahuilla Road (SR 371). By using computer algorithms, researchers were able to piece together a detailed picture of the Cahuilla fault zone responsible for the earthquake swarm. This analysis provides detailed evidence that fault zone valving is a mechanism for seismogenesis in swarms.

References

Unincorporated communities in Riverside County, California
Unincorporated communities in California